Andoni is the Basque adaptation of the given name Anthony in use in the Basque Country.

Andoni may also be as a Romanian-language surname (a variant of Andone) or among Albanians.

It may refer to:

Given name

Football players 

 Andoni Cedrún (born 1960), Spanish retired footballer
 Andoni Goikoetxea (born 1956), Spanish international retired footballer
 Andoni Iraola (born 1982), Spanish international footballer currently playing for New York City FC
 Andoni Imaz (born 1971), Spanish retired footballer
 Andoni Lakabeg (born 1969), Spanish retired footballer
 Andoni López (born 1996), Spanish footballer
 Andoni Murúa (born 1953), Spanish retired footballer
 Andoni Zubizarreta (born 1961), Spanish international retired footballer

Bicycle racers 
 Andoni Aranaga
 Andoni Lafuente

Middle name
 Ion Andoni Goikoetxea (born 1965), Spanish international retired footballer
 Jon Andoni García (born 1983), Spanish footballer currently playing for Deportivo Alavés

Last name
Fatjon Andoni (born 1991), Greek-born Albanian footballer 
Ghassan Andoni (born 1956), Palestinian academic

See also

Andonis Michaelides, known as Mick Karn
Andonis
Andony Hernández

References

Basque masculine given names